Coiled-coil domain containing 8 is a protein that in humans is encoded by the CCDC8 gene.

Function 

This gene encodes a coiled coil domain-containing protein. The encoded protein functions as a cofactor required for p53-mediated apoptosis following DNA damage, and may also play a role in growth through interactions with the cytoskeletal adaptor protein obscurin-like 1.

Clinical relevance
Mutations in this gene have been shown to cause 3-M syndrome.

References

Further reading

External links
  GeneReviews/NIH/NCBI/UW entry on 3-M syndrome